Eldon Robert Hansen is an American mathematician and author who has published in global optimization theory and interval arithmetic.  

Hansens's primary publications include Global Optimization Using Interval Analysis (1992), A Table of Series and Products (1975), and Topics in Interval Analysis (1969).  He also co-authored a number of works with the mathematician William Walster.

Background 
He was born in 1927 near Rochester, Washington.  He completed his undergraduate studies at the University of California, Berkeley.  Hansen received his Ph.D. in mathematics from Stanford University in 1960 on Jacobi methods and Block-Jacobi methods for computing matrix eigenvalues (Bulletin of the American Mathematical Society, 1961). 

Hansen taught at Stanford University, The University of California at Berkeley, San Jose State College, Oxford University, and Washington State University;

Hansen also worked at Lockheed Corporation in Palo Alto, California.

Research 
Hansen's algorithm extended the classical Gauss-Seidel algorithm to interval computations, and has been used to compute uncertainties in delta wing composite structures (Delcroix, Boyer, & Braibant)

Hansen's method used interval analysis to solve a supposedly "insoluble" global optimization problem. The method was originally described for both the one-dimensional and multi-dimensional cases in the 1980s, and is more fully described in the 1992 Global Optimization Using Interval Analysis and the 2nd edition of the book written with William Walster in 2003, and was translated into Russian in 2012.

References 

Amazon.com. Books by Eldon R. Hansen. Available at https://www.amazon.com/Eldon-R.-Hansen/e/B001HPZD4A/ref=sr_tc_2_0?qid=1348294096&sr=1-2-ent</ref>
Bull. Amer. Math. Soc. (1961). "American Doctorates Conferred in 1960." 67 (3): 316–331. Available at http://projecteuclid.org/DPubS?verb=Display&version=1.0&service=UI&handle=euclid.bams/1183524161&page=record.
Delcroix, F.; Boyer, C. & Braibant, V. "Computing Uncertainties in a Delta Wing Composite Using Interval Based Methods," Available at http://www.iccm-central.org/Proceedings/ICCM12proceedings/site/papers/pap674.pdf

Bibliography 

Donelson, John, III.; Hansen, Eldon. Cyclic composite multistep predictor-corrector methods. SIAM J. Numer. Anal. 8 1971 137–157.
Gilliland, Dennis C.; Hansen, Eldon R. A note on some series representations of the integral of a bivariate normal distribution over an offset circle. Naval Res. Logist. Quart. 21 (1974), 207–211.
Hansen, E. Interval forms of Newton's method. Computing 20 (1978), no. 2, 153–163.
Hansen, E.; Patrick, M.; Rusnak, J. Some modifications of Laguerre's method. Nordisk Tidskr. Informationsbehandling (BIT) 17 (1977), no. 4, 409–417.
Hansen, E. R. Bounding the set of solutions of a perturbed global optimization problem. 2nd IIASA Workshop on Global Optimization (Sopron, 1990). J. Global Optim. 1 (1991), no. 4, 359–374.
Hansen. E.R.  Bounding the solution of interval linear equations. SIAM J. Numer. Anal. 29 (1992), no. 5, 1493–1503. 
Hansen, E.R.  Computing zeros of functions using generalized interval arithmetic. Proceedings of the International Conference on Numerical Analysis with Automatic Result Verification (Lafayette, LA, 1993). Interval Comput./Interval. Vychisl. 1993, no. 3, 3--28.
Hansen, E. R. (1975). "A Generalized Interval Arithmetic," In: K. Nickel (ed.), Interval Mathematics, Springer-Verlag, Lecture Notes in Computer Science, Vol. 29, pp. 7–18.
Hansen, E. R. Global optimization using interval analysis: the one-dimensional case. J. Optim. Theory Appl. 29 (1979), no. 3, 331–344.
Hansen, E. R. Preconditioning linearized equations. Computing 58 (1997), no. 2, 187–196.
Hansen, E. R.; Greenberg, R. I. An interval Newton method. Appl. Math. Comput. 12 (1983), no. 2–3, 89–98.
Hansen, Eldon; Sengupta, Saumyendra. Bounding solutions of systems of equations using interval analysis. BIT 21 (1981), no. 2, 203–211.
Hansen, E.R.; Sengupta, S. (1983). "Summary and Steps of a Global Nonlinear Constrained Optimization Algorithm," Report D88977, Lockheed Missiles and Space Co.
Hansen, E. R.; Walster, G. W. Bounds for Lagrange multipliers and optimal points. Comput. Math. Appl. 25 (1993), no. 10–11, 59–69.
Hansen, Eldon. The centered form. In Topics in Interval analysis, Oxford Press, 1969, pp. 102–106.
Hansen, Eldon. Cyclic composite multistep predictor-corrector methods.  Proc. 1969 ACM National Conference, 135–139.
Hansen, Eldon.  A generalized interval arithmetic.  In Interval Mathematics, K. Nickel., ed.  Springer-Verlag, 1975, pp. 7–18.
Hansen, Eldon. Global optimization using interval analysis. Monographs and Textbooks in Pure and Applied Mathematics, 165. Marcel Dekker, Inc., New York, 1992. xvi+230 pp. 
Hansen, Eldon. Global optimization using interval analysis—the multidimensional case. Numer. Math. 34 (1980), no. 3, 247–270.
Hansen, Eldon. Global optimization with data perturbations. Comput. Oper. Res. 11 (1984), no. 2, 97–104. 
Hansen, Eldon. A globally convergent interval method for computing and bounding real roots. BIT 18 (1978), no. 4, 415–424.
Hansen, Eldon R. The hull of preconditioned interval linear equations. Reliab. Comput. 6 (2000), no. 2, 95–103.
Hansen, Eldon. Interval arithmetic in matrix computations. I. J. Soc. Indust. Appl. Math. Ser. B Numer. Anal. 2 1965 308–320. 
Hansen, Eldon. On computing the exact characteristic polynomial.  17th national meeting of ACM, Digest of Technical Papers. 1962, pp. 104–105.
Hansen, Eldon. On linear algebraic equations with interval coefficients. In Topics in Interval analysis, Oxford Press, 1969, pp. 35–46.
Hansen, Eldon. On solving two-point boundary value problems using interval arithmetic. In Topics in Interval analysis, Oxford Press, 1969, pp. 74–90.
Hansen, Eldon. An overview of global optimization using interval analysis. Reliability in computing, 289–307, Perspect. Comput., 19, Academic Press, Boston, MA, 1988.
Hansen, Eldon. Sums of functions satisfying recursion relations. Amer. Math. Monthly 88 (1981), no. 9, 676–679.
Hansen, Eldon; McNolty, Frank.  Statistical distributions occurring in photoelectron phenomena, radar and infrared applications. In C. Taille et al. (eds.)  Statistical distributions in scientific work, vol. 6, 47–77.
Hansen, Eldon; Rasmussen, J.G. Numerical solution of the Curium-242 alpha decay wave equation.  Phys. Rev. 109(5) 1958 1656–1663. 
Hansen, Eldon; Smith, Roberta. A computer program for solving a system of linear equations and matrix inversion with automatic error bounding using interval arithmetic.  Technical report LMSC 4-22-66-3, Lockheed Missiles and Space Co., Palo Alto, CA, 1966. 
Hansen, Eldon R. On the Danilewski method. J. Assoc. Comput. Mach. 10 1963 102–109.
Hansen, Eldon R. On quasicyclic Jacobi methods. J. Assoc. Comput. Mach. 9 1962 118–135.
Hansen, Eldon R. On solving systems of equations using interval arithmetic. Math. Comp. 22 1968 374–384.
Hansen, Eldon. On some sums and integrals involving Bessel functions. Amer. Math. Monthly 73 1966 143–150.
Hansen, Eldon. On the solution of linear algebraic equations with interval coefficients. Linear Algebra and Appl. 2 1969, 153–165.
Hansen, Eldon; Clow, R.; McNolty, Frank. Bayesian Density Functions for Gaussian Noise. Proc. IEEE, 62 (1974), 4134–136.
Hansen, Eldon; Clow, R; McNolty, Frank. Detection probabilities for fluctuating infrared targets, J. Appl. Optics, 14 (1975), 61–66.
Hansen, Eldon; Clow, R.; McNolty, Frank.  Some matched filter configurations for infrared systems. IEEE Trans. Aero. Elect. Sys., AES-8 (1972), 552–558.
Hansen, Eldon; Clow, R.; McNolty, Frank. Some properties of the output integrator in an infrared system. IEEE Trans. Aero. Elect. Sys., AES-8 (1972), 428–438.
Hansen, Eldon; Gilliliand, D. On a series representations of the integral of a bivariate normal distribution over an offset circle. Dept. of Stat. & Prob., Michigan State Univ., RM247, DCG12, 1970.
Hansen, Eldon; Huynen, R.; McNolty, Frank. Certain statistical distributions involving special functions and their applications in Sstatistical distributions in scientific work, Vol. 1: Models and structures.  G.P. Patil, S. Kotz, and J.K. Ord, eds., D. Reidel Publ. Co., 1975.
Hansen, Eldon; Oomen, B.J.  The optimal properties of two action discretized linear reward-inaction learning automata.  Proc. Computer and Info System Sciences Conf., Princeton Univ., March 15–16, 1984.
Hansen, Eldon; Patrick, Merrell. Estimating the multiplicity of a root. Numer. Math. 27 (1976/77), no. 1, 121--131.
Hansen, Eldon; Patrick, Merrell. A family of root finding methods. Numer. Math. 27 (1976/77), no. 3, 257--269
Hansen, Eldon R.; Patrick, Merell L.; Wang, Richard L. C. Polynomial evaluation with scaling. ACM Trans. Math. Software 16 (1990), no. 1, 86--93. 
Hansen, Eldon; Sengupta, Saumyendra. Bounding solutions of systems of equations using interval analysis. BIT 21 (1981), no. 2, 203--211.
Hansen, Eldon; Sengupta, Saumyendra. Global constrained optimization using interval analysis. Interval mathematics, 1980 (Freiburg, 1980), pp. 25--47, Academic Press, New York-London, 1980. 
Hansen, Eldon; Smith, Roberta. Interval arithmetic in matrix computations. II. SIAM J. Numer. Anal. 4 1967 1--9. 
Hansen, Eldon; G. William Walster. global optimization in nonlinear mixed integer problems.  In William F. Ames and R. Vichnevesky, eds. Proceedings of the 10th IMACS world congress on systems simulation and scientific computing, vol. 1. IMACS, Plantation, FL, 1982, pp. 379-381.
Hansen, Eldon; Walster, G. William. Global optimization using interval analysis. Second edition, revised and expanded. With a foreword by Ramon Moore. Monographs and Textbooks in Pure and Applied Mathematics, 264. Marcel Dekker, Inc., New York, 2004. xviii+489 pp.
Hansen, Eldon R. On computing the exact characteristic polynomial.  17th National Meeting of ACM, Digest of Technical Papers, 1962, pp. 265-104.
Hansen, Eldon R. On cyclic Jacobi methods. J. Soc. Indust. Appl. Math. 11 1963 448--459.
Hansen, Eldon. A multidimensional interval Newton method. Reliab. Comput. 12 (2006), no. 4, 253--272.
Hansen, Eldon R. Reminiscence.  Reliab. Comput. 6 (2000), no. 2, 225--226.
Hansen, Eldon R. On solving systems of equations using interval arithmetic. Math. Comp. 22 1968 374--384.
Hansen, Eldon. Sharpening interval computations. Reliab. Comput. 12 (2006), no. 1, 21--34.
Hansen, Eldon R. Sharpness in interval computations. Reliab. Comput. 3 (1997), no. 1, 17--29.
Hansen, Eldon R. (1975). A Table of Series and Products. Upper Saddle River, NJ: Prentice-Hall.
Hansen, Eldon. A theorem on regularity of interval matrices. Reliab. Comput. 11 (2005), no. 6, 495--497.
Hansen, Eldon R. (1969). Topics in Interval Analysis. Oxford: Oxford UP.
Hansen, Eldon R., Comstock, R.L. Analysis of nondegenerate parallel pumping of magnetoelastic waves in ferrogmagnets.  J. Applied Physics., 36 (1965), 1567-1569.
Hansen, Eldon R.; Patrick, Merrell L. Some relations and values for the generalized Riemann zeta functions. Math. Comp. 16 1962 265--274.
Hansen, Eldon R.; Walster, G. William. Sharp bounds on interval polynomial roots. Reliab. Comput. 8 (2002), no. 2, 115--122.
Hansen, Eldon; Walster, G. William. Solving overdetermined systems of interval linear equations. Reliab. Comput. 12 (2006), no. 3, 239--243. 
Hansen, Eldon Robert. ON JACOBI METHODS AND BLOCK-JACOBI METHODS FOR COMPUTING MATRIX EIGENVALUES. Thesis (Ph.D.)–Stanford University. ProQuest LLC, Ann Arbor, MI, 1960. 129 pp.
Huynen, J. Richard; McNolty, Frank; Hansen, Eldon. Component distributions for fluctuating radar targets. IEEE Trans. Aerospace and Electron. Systems AES-11 (1975), no. 6, 1316--1332.
McNolty, Frank; Doyle, James; Hansen, Eldon. Properties of the mixed exponential failure process. Technometrics 22 (1980), no. 4, 555--565. 
McNolty, Frank; Hansen, Eldon. Some aspects of Swerling models for fluctuating radar cross section. IEEE Trans. Aerospace and Electron. Systems AES-10 (1974), 281--285.
Neumaier, A. (1980). "Review: Global Optimization Using Interval Analysis." Available at https://www.mat.univie.ac.at/~neum/glopt/hansen.html.
Oommen, B. J.; Hansen, Eldon. The asymptotic optimality of discretized linear reward-inaction learning automata. IEEE Trans. Systems Man Cybernet. 14 (1984), no. 3, 542–545.
Oommen, B. John; Hansen, E. R. List organizing strategies using stochastic move-to-front and stochastic move-to-rear operations. SIAM J. Comput. 16 (1987), no. 4, 705--716.
Oommen, B. John; Hansen, E. R.; Munro, J. I. Deterministic optimal and expedient move-to-rear list organizing strategies. Theoret. Comput. Sci. 74 (1990), no. 2, 183--197.
Walster, G. William; Hansen, Eldon R. Computing interval parameter bounds from fallible measurements using overdetermined (tall) systems of nonlinear equations. COCOS 2002. 171-177. 
Walster, G. William; Hansen, Eldon. Using pillow functions to efficiently compute crude range tests. Numer. Algorithms 37 (2004), no. 1-4, 401--415.
Walster, G. W.; Hansen, E. R.; Sengupta, S. Test results for a global optimization algorithm. Numerical optimization, 1984 (Boulder, Colo., 1984), 272–287, SIAM, Philadelphia, PA, 1985.

Year of birth missing (living people)
Living people
20th-century American mathematicians